Youga is a village in the Zabré Department of Boulgou Province in south-eastern Burkina Faso, about 2 km north from border with Ghana. As of 2005, the village had a population of 1018, but due to discovery of gold in the vicinity and subsequent establishment of Youga Gold Mine, population is growing. 

The village does not have running water or electricity, and most economic activity is subsistence farming, and  also a few primitive taverns that serve warm beer. Some people got jobs at Youga Gold Mine and the resulting newfound prosperity is reflected in a number of makeshift shops springing up by the sides of dusty roads. Burkina Mining Company, the owners of Youga Gold Mine, have built three additional classes to complete the primary school to six classes and renovated the clinic in the village, and Youga Power Project, designed and managed by South African company AMPCOR, is in its final stages of linking  Youga Gold Mine and Youga village to the Ghanaian VRA electricity power grid. 

People usually  go to Ghana, especially Bawku, Bologatenga or Zebila, if they need a hospitals. Some parents send their children to Ghanaian schools. Most of the families in Youga area are divided by the border, with some members in Ghana and some in Burkina. Kousaal, the dialect spoken in Youga, is one of the most widespread dialects in the north of Ghana.

Politically, Youga depends on Tenkodogo and Zabre. One of the first MPs of our country, the late Nanga Antoine, lived in Youga, and one of the first civil servants, Nanga Zoure David, a former policeman retired since 1996, still lives in the village. He has been one of the important counselors to the different chiefs since he is located in Youga.

References

Populated places in the Centre-Est Region
Boulgou Province